James McCleery (December 2, 1837 – November 5, 1871) was an Ohio-born lawyer and officer in the Union Army during the American Civil War. He also served as U.S. Representative from Louisiana.

Biography
Born in Mecca Township, Trumbull County, Ohio, McCleery attended Oberlin (Ohio) College in 1859 and 1860.

He served in the Union Army during the American Civil War. He received a commission as second lieutenant of Company A, 41st Ohio Volunteer Infantry, in 1861, and was wounded in the Battle of Shiloh in 1862, as a result losing his right arm. He was promoted through the ranks to major in 1865. He entered the Regular Army as captain in the 45th U.S. Infantry in 1866 and subsequently received the brevets of major (in the regulars) and brigadier general of Volunteers. He retired on December 15, 1870, having settled in St. Mary Parish, Louisiana, where he purchased a plantation and went into the practice of law. He was connected with the Freedmen's Bureau not only in Louisiana but also in North Carolina. He soon moved to Shreveport, Louisiana, where he was appointed superintendent of public education for the fourth division.

McCleery was elected as a Republican from Louisiana's 4th congressional district to the Forty-second Congress and served from March 4, 1871, until his death while on a visit in New York City on November 5, 1871.

He was interred in the Christian Church Cemetery in Cortland, Ohio. McCleery's tombstone in the Cortland Christian Church cemetery reads as follows:

JAMES MCCLEERY
BREVET
BRIG GEN
41 OHIO INF
Born  December 2, 1837
Died  November 5, 1871

See also
List of United States Congress members who died in office (1790–1899)

References

1837 births
1871 deaths
American Disciples of Christ
American members of the Churches of Christ
Louisiana lawyers
Oberlin College alumni
People of Ohio in the American Civil War
People from Trumbull County, Ohio
People from St. Mary Parish, Louisiana
Politicians from Shreveport, Louisiana
United States Army officers
Union Army officers
Republican Party members of the United States House of Representatives from Louisiana
19th-century American politicians
19th-century American lawyers